The Maui Nui 'akialoa or Lana'i 'akialoa (Akialoa lanaiensis) was a Hawaiian honeycreeper of the subfamily Carduelinae and the family Fringillidae. It was endemic to the island of Lanai, Hawaii in modern times, but seems to have occurred on all major islands of former Maui Nui before human settlement.

The Maui Nui akialoa was one of the birds that made up the Hawaiian honeyeater genus Akialoa. This genus included about 7 species of long-billed birds that were from five to nine inches in length. What made up to a third of their length was their bill which ranged from an inch in length, to two and a half.  This species was the second largest of the recently extinct akialoas(3 larger species, the Hoopoe-billed 'akialoa and 2 undescribed, went extinct when Polynesians colonised the islands) and was the most widespread. It once inhabited the islands of Lanai, Kahoolawe, Maui and Molokai (the islands that together made up the prehistoric island of Maui Nui), but it vanished on all except Lanai before scientists could see them alive there.

It was a grayish-yellow bird that was found at mid-altitude areas where it was seen pecking on bark in search or insects and seen pecking at flowers in search of nectar. The bird was six inches long, with a bill that was an inch and a half in length.

It was a bird that was very fragile in nature and elusive. It was never found in high numbers and may have been on the verge of extinction on Maui when the Europeans arrived. The loss of the understory layer to pigs was a big hit to the last of the birds. If the land was cleared by pigs, the land would have a forest floor layer made up of durable, pig resistant plants the akialoa was not accustomed to. By 1892, this akialoa was gone, and was the first of seven species of akialoa to go extinct in modern times due to habitat loss and introduced diseases.

References

Maui Nui
Hawaiian honeycreepers
Extinct birds of Hawaii
Endemic birds of Hawaii
Maui Nui akialoa
Bird extinctions since 1500
Maui Nui akialoa
Taxonomy articles created by Polbot